The 1908 Indiana gubernatorial election was held on November 3, 1908. Democratic nominee Thomas R. Marshall narrowly defeated Republican nominee James Eli Watson with 48.95% of the vote.

General election

Candidates
Major party candidates
Thomas R. Marshall, Democratic, member of the Indiana Democratic Central Committee
James Eli Watson, Republican, U.S. Representative from Indiana

Other candidates
Sumner W. Haynes, Prohibition
Frank S. Goodman, Socialist
F.J.S. Robinson, People's
O.P. Stoner, Socialist Labor
James M. Zion, Independent

Results

References

1908
Indiana
Gubernatorial